Sara Noxx is a German musician and member of the alternative music scene. She is also a member of the band Essexx, who in 1997 were the winners of the Zillo band contest.

Career 
Noxx's debut solo release was the 1997 mini-album Society on Nightshade Productions.

Her 2001, the album Exxtasy reached No. 9 on the DAC. In 2003, Noxx released her instrumental album Nonvoxx. In late 2003, the album Equinoxx and the single "Colder & Colder" were released which reached the No. 1 position of all European alternative charts for several weeks.

In 2008, Noxx released a three-CD set XX-ray including numerous new interpretations, remixes and duets but also a collection of multi-lingual interpretations of her work.
In 2009, her single "Superior Love" from her Intoxxication album reached No. 4 on the DAC. 

To date, Noxx has released three full albums as well as numerous singles, LPs and special releases.

Related projects and collaborations 
Noxx is a member of the band Essexx and is credited with remixing the song Navigator for Blutengel. She did vocals on the X-Fusion song Reap the Whirlwind, remixed by The Eternal Afflict. Her 2008 single, "Earth Song", featured guest vocals from Project Pitchfork, and reached No. 1 on the DAC. Noxx sang a duet with ASP on the song "Imbecile Anthem" for the duet/remix album Die Zusammenkunft. Her cover of "Where the Wild Roses Grow" featured world-renowned forensic biologist Mark Benecke.

Discography

Albums, LPs and singles 

Released on Nightshade Productions:

Society (1997)
Noxxious (1997)
Paradoxx (1998)

Released on Scanner Records:

Exxtasy (2001)
Nonvoxx (2003)
Colder and Colder (2003)
Equinoxx (2003)

Released on Prussia Records (A label of Rough Trade Records):

Earth Song (feat. Project Pitchfork) (2008)
Superior Love (The Dark Side) (feat. 18 Summers) (2009)
Superior Love (The Bright Side) (feat. Limahl) (2009)
Intoxxication (2009)
Where the Wild Roses Grow (feat. Mark Benecke) (2011)
Weg zurück (feat. Goethes Erben) (2014)
Entre Quatre Yeuxx (Standard & Limited Edition) (2015)

References

External links 
Official website
Discography at discogs.com

Singers from Berlin
Living people
German women pop singers
Year of birth missing (living people)